A special election was held in  on September 27, 1827 to fill a vacancy left by the death of William Burleigh (A) on July 2, 1827

Election results

McIntire took his seat December 3, 1827.  Holmes was subsequently elected to the Senate, taking his seat January 26, 1829

See also
List of special elections to the United States House of Representatives

References

Maine 1827 01
Maine 1827 01
1827 01
Maine 01
United States House of Representatives 01
United States House of Representatives 1827 01